Justice Staples may refer to:

Abram Penn Staples (1885–1951), American lawyer, legislator, associate justice of the Virginia Supreme Court and Attorney General of Virginia
Waller Redd Staples (1826–1897), American lawyer, slave owner, politician and associate justice of the Virginia Supreme Court
William R. Staples, Chief Justice (1854–1856) and associate justice of the Rhode Island Supreme Court